Chhay-Kheng Nhem (born 18 July 1947) is a Cambodian former butterfly swimmer. He competed in two events at the 1972 Summer Olympics.

References

External links
 

1947 births
Living people
Cambodian male butterfly swimmers
Olympic swimmers of Cambodia
Swimmers at the 1972 Summer Olympics
Place of birth missing (living people)